Robert Courcy (born January 4, 1936) is a Canadian former professional ice hockey centre. Although he never played in the National Hockey League (NHL), he spent several seasons in the American Hockey League (AHL) and Western Hockey League (WHL). Drafted by the Philadelphia Flyers in the 1967 NHL Expansion Draft from the Montreal Canadiens, he was the only player out of the 20 drafted by the Flyers not to play for them.

External links

1936 births
Living people
Buffalo Bisons (AHL) players
Canadian ice hockey centres
Chicoutimi Saguenéens (QSHL) players
Cleveland Barons (1937–1973) players
Hull-Ottawa Canadiens players
Ice hockey people from Quebec
People from Granby, Quebec
Quebec Aces (AHL) players
San Diego Gulls (WHL) players
Sault Thunderbirds players
Seattle Totems (WHL) players
Shawinigan-Falls Cataracts (QSHL) players
Trois-Rivières Lions (1955–1960) players